Caligo illioneus, the Illioneus giant owl, is an owl butterfly belonging to the nymphalid family, Morphinae subfamily, tribe Brassolini.

Etymology
The genus Latin name Caligo means "darkness" and may refer to the active periods, as these butterflies preferentially fly in dusk. The specific name illioneus derives from Ilionesus, a Trojan companion of Aeneas in Virgil's Aeneid.

Description

In this large owl butterfly the dorsal sides of the wings vary from light brilliant blue to purplish with dark brown edges, while the undersides have a highly cryptic dull brown color, with huge yellow-rimmed eyespots resembling to the eyes of an owl.

The caterpillars grow on banana plants, causing the destruction of large areas of banana plantations, while the adults mainly feed on the juices of fermenting fruits.

Distribution
The species is native to Costa Rica and it is widespread in most of South America, particularly in Brazil, Colombia, Ecuador, Guyana, Peru, and Venezuela.

Habitat
This owl butterfly  lives in South American rainforests and secondary forests.

Subspecies
Caligo illioneus illioneus (Suriname, Venezuela, Trinidad)
Caligo illioneus oberon Butler, 1870 (Costa Rica, Panama, Ecuador, Venezuela, Colombia)
Caligo illioneus pampeiro Fruhstorfer, 1904 (Paraguay)
Caligo illioneus pheidriades Fruhstorfer, 1912 (Bolivia)
Caligo illioneus praxsiodus Fruhstorfer, 1912 (Peru)

References

 L. D. Cleare Jnr., F.L.S. - On the life-history of Valigo illioneus, Cram. (Lep., Morphidae) - 1926 The Royal Entomological Society
 BioLib.cz

External links
 Lepidoptera

illioneus
Nymphalidae of South America
Taxa named by Pieter Cramer
Butterflies described in 1775